Alvin Antonio Saldaña Muñoz (born 5 July 1976) is a Chilean teacher who was elected as a member of the Chilean Constitutional Convention.

References

External links
 
 BCN Profile

Living people
1976 births
21st-century Chilean politicians
Diego Portales University alumni
Members of the Chilean Constitutional Convention
People from Rengo